The flag of Equatorial Guinea was adopted on August 21, 1979. The six stars on the map represent the country's mainland and five islands. Under the rule of dictator Francisco Nguema the flag was modified and a different national emblem was used in it. After he was deposed the original flag was restored.

Features and symbolism 

The flag is a horizontal tricolor, with green, white and red stripes and a blue triangle at the hoist. Green symbolizes the natural resources, agriculture and jungles of the country. Blue symbolizes the sea, which connects the mainland with the islands. White symbolizes peace. Red symbolizes the bloodshed by the fighters for independence.

History 

The flag was first flown  the day of independence, October 12, 1968, and it showed the national emblem in the center. However, in 1973, during the regime of Francisco Nguema, a different national emblem was used on the flag. Under Nguema's rule, the coat of arms consisted of several tools, a sword and a cockerel. The modified national motto Trabajo (work), and Unidad, Paz, Justicia (Unity, Peace, Justice) was written in two stripes. The original coat of arms was restored after Nguema was deposed on 21 August 1979. The arms consists of a silver shield with a silk-cotton tree, or Ceiba in the local language, which was derived from the arms of Rio Muni. Above the shield is an arc of 6 six-pointed yellow stars, that represent Rio Muni and the offshore islands. Beneath the shield is a silver scroll with the national motto, Unidad, Paz, Justicia ("Unity, Peace, Justice"). It is considered that under a silk-cotton tree a treaty was signed between Spain and a local ruler that marked the beginning of the colonial rule.

References

External links 

 

Flags introduced in 1979
Flags of Africa
Flag
Equatorial Guinea